Ullernåsen is an Oslo Metro station located at Ullern in Oslo, Norway. It is on Kolsås Line between Åsjordet and Montebello. It was opened on 15 June 1942. Since June 2006 it was temporarily closed while Kolsåsbanen was upgraded, and reopened on 18 August 2008.

References

External links

Oslo Metro stations in Oslo
Railway stations opened in 1942
1942 establishments in Norway